Ordos Campaign may refer to:

 Qin's campaign against the Xiongnu (215 BC), or Meng Tian's Ordos campaign
 Han–Xiongnu War, which involved several campaigns in the Ordos region
 Ordos campaign (1592), during the Ming dynasty